Atlético Clube Alcanenense is a Portuguese sports club from Alcanena.

The men's football team played on the third tier when it was called Segunda Divisão B, being relegated in 1996–97, and later again played on the third tier until being relegated from the 2017–18 Campeonato de Portugal.

References

Football clubs in Portugal
Association football clubs established in 1942
1942 establishments in Portugal